Christian Anelli (born 1 February 1989) is an Italian professional footballer who plays as a centre back for  club Seregno Calcio.

Club career
Born in Asola, Anelli made his senior debut for Serie A club Parma on 4 May 2008 against Genoa, as a late substitute.

On 31 July 2019 he joined Calcio Foggia.

On 24 August 2021, he signed with Seregno.

References

External links
 
 

1989 births
Living people
People from Asola, Lombardy
Footballers from Lombardy
Italian footballers
Association football defenders
Serie A players
Serie C players
Serie D players
A.C. Montichiari players
Parma Calcio 1913 players
A.C. Giacomense players
Valenzana Mado players
Virtus Bergamo Alzano Seriate 1909 players
U.S. Pergolettese 1932 players
A.S.D. Fanfulla players
Como 1907 players
Calcio Foggia 1920 players
U.S. 1913 Seregno Calcio players
Sportspeople from the Province of Mantua